Kostenets is a village in the Sofia Province southwestern Bulgaria, located in the Kostenets Municipality (which also has a separate town of Kostenets). As of the 2000 census, the village had a total population of 4,201. It ranks 14th by population of all Bulgarian villages.

Geography 
Kostenets is located at the foot of the Rila mountain, 63 kilometers southeast of Sofia, about 6 kilometers south of the town of Kostenets and 35 kilometers east of Borovets. Its altitude ranges from 650 meters in the northern part to 725 meters in the southern part.

History 
It is assumed that the area was originally settled by the Thracian tribe Bessi around 2nd century BC. The settlement was the first one in today's Kostenets municipality. During an archaeological study of the "Gorna cherkva" area were found remains of an old fortress and the footprints of an old Christian basilica from the 5th century as well as ancient pottery, Roman, Byzantine and medieval Bulgarian coins.

Cultural and natural landmarks 
 Kostenets waterfall, located about 3 km south of the village and described by Ivan Vazov.
 The nearby historic mountain pass Gate of Trajan.

Gallery

References

External links

 Kostenets Municipality

Villages in Sofia Province